Piz Nair (from Romansh: black peak) is the name of several mountains in Switzerland:

Piz Nair, near St. Moritz
Piz Nair (Glarus Alps), near Sedrun
Piz Nair (Sesvenna Alps), in the Swiss National Park
Schwarzberg (Lepontine Alps), between the cantons of Uri and Graubünden